.5: The Gray Chapter is the fifth studio album by American heavy metal band Slipknot. Released in Australia, Belgium and the Netherlands on October 17, 2014, the UK on October 20, 2014 and in North America on October 21, 2014 by Roadrunner Records. It was the first studio album by the band in six years and the first not to feature original founding members bassist Paul Gray and drummer Joey Jordison due to the death of Gray in 2010 (the title of the album being a reference to his surname), and Jordison being fired from the band in late 2013, as well as the only Slipknot album to feature original guitarist Donnie Steele on bass, although the tracks he played on are unknown, and the first Slipknot album to have Alessandro Venturella on bass and Jay Weinberg on drums. The album includes six singles and has received commercial success and acclaiming reviews. A standard and deluxe edition of the album was released. It is also the band's final studio album to feature their longtime percussionist Chris Fehn before his dismissal from the band due to a lawsuit in March 2019.

"The Negative One" received a nomination for Best Metal Performance at the 57th annual Grammy Awards. The album was nominated for Best Rock Album the following year, along with a Best Metal Performance nomination for the song "Custer".

Background

The writing process of the record began in late 2013. Wanting to dedicate more time to the album, guitarist Jim Root decided not to tour with Stone Sour in January 2014.

A new bassist and drummer were added to the lineup during live shows. Taylor told Loudwire that two similar masks were created for their appearances in music videos and stage performances, as, when the new members were given the opportunity to make their own masks, the results were, according to Taylor, "kind of cartoony" and did not fit the mind set of Slipknot. Both members were briefly shown in the music video for "The Devil in I", but their identities have not been announced by Slipknot amidst speculation. Root revealed in an interview that founding guitarist and former touring bassist Donnie Steele was involved in some of the studio sessions for the album, but that ultimately Steele declined to rejoin the band in favor of starting a family with his wife. Bassist Alessandro Venturella of Krokodil was identified by the unique tattoos on his hands, performing in the video for "The Devil in I". Jay Weinberg from the band Against Me! was brought in to audition on drums after Joey Jordison was fired from Slipknot. Jay Weinberg is the son of Max Weinberg, the drummer for Bruce Springsteen's E Street Band and Conan O'Brien's drummer and band leader for his late night talk show. Max Weinberg introduced Jay Weinberg to Slipknot and from there on forged a friendship by going to several concerts and being invited backstage; the band liked what he brought to the table and was told he was free to join if he wanted and he accepted. The album was produced by Greg Fidelman and mixed by Joe Barresi. Fidelman is known for his work with Metallica, System of a Down, Audioslave and more, as well as mixing Slipknot's third album, Vol. 3: (The Subliminal Verses), in 2004.

Promotion and tour
On July 15, the band began releasing short teasers for the new album for over a two-week period that turned out to be clips from the official video along with samples from a song entitled "The Negative One". The song was released on August 1, 2014 and an accompanying video was released on August 5, 2014. It was directed by Shawn Crahan; however, it did not feature any of the band members.
On August 13, 2014, the band revealed the cover art for their official radio single entitled "The Devil in I", and the single premiered on August 24, 2014. The official video for the single was unveiled on September 12 featuring the members with new variations of their masks with the exception of Taylor who debuted a new mask and the new bassist and drummer's masks which were very similar.

Slipknot began their world tour at the second iteration of Knotfest as headliners on October 25 and the 26 with Anthrax, Five Finger Death Punch, Otep and Black Label Society among others in California. A co-headline North American and European tour with Korn dubbed the Prepare for Hell tour commenced afterwards with King 810 in support. Slipknot and Korn embarked on the British leg of the Prepare For Hell tour in January 2015. In addition to the standard edition, a deluxe edition featuring two listed and three unlisted bonus tracks, and a special edition featuring a T-shirt of the album cover have also been released.

Reception

Critical response

.5: The Gray Chapter received generally positive reviews, as most critics praised the return of their older sound from Slipknot and Iowa, while maintaining the melodies the band explored on Vol. 3: (The Subliminal Verses). Florino characterized it as "the most abrasive work since their self-titled debut," The Guardian's Dom Lawson as "every bit as warped and explosive as previous records" Ray Van Horn of Blabbermouth.net hailed the album as "a return to their punishing roots" and noted that "AOV" showcased some elements of thrash metal. Exclaim! critic Bradley Zorgdrager pointed out that Slipknot "wastes no time kicking it back to 2001's Iowa" while Metal Hammer's critic Dom Lawson noted that "there's plenty of [...] brutal, turbocharged Slipknot [...] here," while Rock Revolt mentioned that the album uses elements from their previous studio albums while "pushing the creative boundaries of [their] past albums into new territory." Q magazine's Tom Bryant complained that the album's lighter tracks, namely "Goodbye," "Killpop," and "The One That Kills The Least," were "disappointingly timid." However, he followed by commenting that "It's possible to entirely forget these when Slipknot play to their strengths: unrelenting darkness and attack," using "Custer," "The Devil in I," and "Lech" as examples.

Several critics praised the way the album acknowledged Gray's memory. Rock Revolt noted plenty of lyrical content relating to Gray. While Revolver magazine critic Dan Epstein and Gregory Heaney from AllMusic concluded that "they don't try to sugarcoat their loss, anger or grief anywhere on the album," and that "from that deep well of pain, another great Slipknot record has emerged," and that "they're able to channel their grief into a productive album, allowing them to continue moving forward [...] with one of the strongest albums of their career," respectively. Zorgdrager saw it as "it's a considerable accomplishment and a lovely eulogy to their fallen comrade." Several critics appreciated the composition of the album, with Van Horn characterizing it as "a largely dark, often moving listening experience." Loudwire critic Chad Childers wrote noted the "mix of all the different sounds" creating "a musical journey" and pointed that while the album "rocks and pummels you in all the right places like you would hope, it also shows a depth in emotion and some heavily personal moments on a much grander scale," while Artistdirect critic Rick Florino gave the album a perfect rating concluding that "by the time this journey ends, it feels as if Slipknot have come full circle." Billboard critic Gary Suarez was a little more critical of the album stating, "for such an emotionally loaded comeback, .5: The Gray Chapter is Slipknot's least gripping LP. [...] "Skeptic" is lyrically awkward, but the band recovers well on processional closer "If Rain Is What You Want." Emblematic of both Slipknot's strengths and its weaknesses, perhaps this album is the sort of warts-and-all eulogy Gray would have wanted."

Former drummer Joey Jordison praised the album saying that he "listened to the whole record multiple times, and I think it's great. It's fucking cool and I'm glad they moved on. I'm glad they're carrying on the name, because what's important is the fans."

Accolades
The album's lead single, "The Negative One", was nominated for the 2014 Grammy Award for Best Metal Performance at the 57th Grammy Awards. Additionally, the album was nominated for the Best Rock Album and "Custer" was nominated for Best Metal Performance at the 58th Grammy Awards.Year-end rankings

Commercial performance.5: The Gray Chapter landed in the number one spot in Australia on the ARIA Albums Chart with 14,188 first week sales. It was Slipknot's second album to debut at number one on the US Billboard 200 albums chart by selling 132,000 copies in its first week. The album also debuted at number one in Japan, Canada, Russia and Switzerland. It had top 5 debuts in the United Kingdom, Germany, Ireland, Austria, New Zealand, Mexico, Denmark and Finland.

Track listing
All songs credited to Slipknot. Writing credits taken from ASCAP.

"The Burden" lasts 5:23. There are three hidden tracks that follow. The first, at 2:00, is silent, and is believed to be a silence for deceased member Paul Gray. The second hidden track, at 6:38, starts with distorted music, before moving on to an interview with distorted audio. The interview is with a man who claims to have written massively famous heavy metal albums. The interviewer is believed to be percussionist Chris Fehn. The  third track, at 1:39, is a farewell track played at the end of their live shows. The tracks are commonly referred to as "-Silent-", "-Talk-" and "-Funny-" respectively, but don't have any official names. The three tracks are omitted on streaming service versions of the Special edition.

Charts

Weekly charts

Year-end charts

Singles

Other charting songs

 Notes 

A  "The Devil in I" did not enter the Billboard'' Hot 100, but peaked at number 23 on the Bubbling Under Hot 100 Singles chart, a 25-song extension to the Hot 100.

Certifications

Personnel

Slipknot
(#8) Corey Taylor – lead vocals, bass on 'Goodbye'
(#7) Mick Thomson – guitars, bass
(#6) Shawn "Clown" Crahan – percussion, backing vocals, additional drums on 'Goodbye' and 'If Rain Is What You Want', lead vocals on 'Be Prepared For Hell'
(#5) Craig "133" Jones – sampling, keyboards
(#4) Jim Root – guitars, bass
(#3) Chris Fehn – percussion, backing vocals
(#0) Sid Wilson – turntables
 Alessandro Venturella – bass
 Jay Weinberg – drums

Additional personnel
Donnie Steele – bass
Greg Fidelman – production
Joe Barresi – mixing
Vlado Meller – mastering

References

2014 albums
Albums produced by Greg Fidelman
Roadrunner Records albums
Slipknot (band) albums